Catherine Gotani Hara is a Malawian politician who has been the Speaker of the National Assembly since June 2019, the first woman to hold the position.

Early life and education
Gotani Hara attended Kamuzu Academy, and has a Bachelor of Arts in political science from Chancellor College at the University of Malawi. While studying, she ran the university's wing of the Malawi Congress Party. From 1998 to 2000, she completed professional postgraduate training  in International Development and Project Planning and Management Brighton.

Career
Gotani Hara was a Programme Officer for the UK's Department of International Development, the first Malawian to be recruited to that level. She was responsible for the sustainable livelihood projects for both Mozambique and Malawi.

Gotani Hara was elected as the Member of Parliament for Mzimba North East in 2009, representing the Democratic Progressive Party.

Gotani Hara was the Deputy Minister of Transport and Public Infrastructure, Deputy Minister for Gender, and the Minister for Health in the Joyce Banda government. She represented the Malawi Head of State at a number of international events, and was the Chair of the Malawi delegation to the Climate Change Summit in Brazil. She is a board member of the Northern Region Water Board. After the death of President Bingu wa Mutharika in 2012, she publicly declared that it unconstitutional for members in the ruling DPP politburo to take over the presidency. She took a break from politics from 2014 to 2019.

Gotani Hara was re-elected in May 2019 representing Malawi Congress Party and on 19 June 2019, she was elected the first female Speaker of the National Assembly, with 97 votes to 93 over former deputy speaker Esther Mcheka Chilenje.

References

External links
 Reaction to Gotani Hara's election as Speaker

Living people
Alumni of Kamuzu Academy
University of Malawi alumni
Alumni of the University of Brighton
Health ministers of Malawi
Members of the National Assembly (Malawi)
Year of birth missing (living people)
Speakers of the National Assembly (Malawi)
Malawi Congress Party politicians
Women legislative speakers
21st-century Malawian women politicians
21st-century Malawian politicians